The Kinleys were an American country music duo composed of identical twin sisters Heather and Jennifer Kinley (born November 5, 1970). Between 1997 and 2000, they recorded two albums for Epic Records (1997's Just Between You and Me and 2000's II). The duo charted eight entries on the Billboard Hot Country Songs charts in this timespan, including the No. 7 "Please", their debut single. Another one of their songs, "Somebody's Out There Watching", was featured in the soundtrack to the television series Touched by an Angel. After departing their label in 2000 due to dissatisfaction with touring, the duo released one last album in 2004 before disbanding.

Biography
Heather and Jennifer Kinley were born November 5, 1970, in Philadelphia, Pennsylvania. The two are identical twin sisters.

Having started out on Al Alberts' Showcase, a televised talent show from the Philadelphia area, the twins moved to Nashville at the age of 19. After five years of training and practicing, they caught the attention of talent scouts and were signed with Epic Records. Their debut album Just Between You and Me was issued in late 1997, producing a No. 7 hit on the Billboard country singles charts in its lead-off single "Please". This song was followed by the album's title track at No. 12, although the next two singles both fell short of Top 40. Just Between You and Me was certified gold by the Recording Industry Association of America. Its commercial success led to a tour with Clint Black and a radio programmers' showcase in Las Vegas, Nevada. They also won the Academy of Country Music's 1997 award for Top New Vocal Duo/Group.

The duo also recorded the song "Somebody's Out There Watching", which was used on the TV soundtrack album for the show Touched by an Angel. Released as a single in 1998, it reached Top 20 on the country charts. In July 1999, they released the first single from their planned second album, "My Heart Is Still Beating". The single failed to make the Top 40 in the Country charts and the second, self-titled album, slated for an Autumn 1999 release, was put on hold by Epic, who decided to bring in Radney Foster to work with the duo in order to broaden their sound and gain stronger chart appeal. "My Heart Is Still Beating" was eventually not included on their second album.

The duo did not release another single until the Foster-produced "She Ain't the Girl for You", the first single from their second album, II. This album also produced a minor single in "I'm In", which peaked at number 35 on the country charts. Ten years later, Keith Urban released a cover of this song, which went to number 2. Half of II was produced by Tony Haselden and Russ Zavitson, with whom the duo worked on their first album, while singer-songwriter Radney Foster (who also co-wrote "I'm In") produced the other half.

After II, the Kinleys exited Epic's roster, as "neither enjoyed life on the road one bit" and both had wanted to start families. They self-released their third and final album, All in the Family, in 2004 before disbanding.

Personal lives
Both sisters married in 2000, seven months apart: Heather to Mark Mendenhall, and Jennifer to Adam Hughes. Both sisters each have two sons, and Heather has a stepdaughter and stepson. As of 2013, Jennifer worked as a registered nurse in Nashville, and sang in a Nashville church whose music leader is former MCA Records artist Lionel Cartwright.

Discography

Studio albums

Singles

Notes

Music videos

Awards

References

1970 births
Living people
Country music groups from Pennsylvania
Country music duos
Identical twin females
Musical groups from Philadelphia
Epic Records artists
American twins
Twin musical duos
Musical groups established in 1997
Musical groups disestablished in 2005
Female musical duos